Ardstraw Football Club is an intermediate-level football club playing in the Northern Ireland Intermediate League in Northern Ireland. The club is based in Ardstraw, County Tyrone. It is managed by Nigel Boyd and captained by former manager Lee "The Slab" Warnock, a tyrone constitution sports correspondent and Northern Ireland regions cup squad member.

The club participates in the Irish Cup.

References

External links
 Ardstraw FC web site
 nifootball.co.uk - (For fixtures, results and tables of all Northern Ireland amateur football leagues)

Association football clubs in Northern Ireland
Association football clubs in County Tyrone
1972 establishments in Northern Ireland